Maurice Lucas (February 18, 1952 – October 31, 2010) was an American professional basketball player who played in the American Basketball Association (ABA) and the National Basketball Association (NBA).  He was a four-time NBA All-Star and won an NBA championship with the Portland Trail Blazers in 1977. He was named to the ABA All-Time Team.

Lucas played college basketball for the Marquette Golden Eagles. He began his pro career with two years in the ABA with the Spirits of St. Louis and Kentucky Colonels. He then played twelve seasons in the NBA with the Trail Blazers, New Jersey Nets, New York Knickerbockers, Phoenix Suns, Los Angeles Lakers and Seattle SuperSonics. The starting power forward on the Trail Blazers' 1976–77 championship team, he was nicknamed "the Enforcer" because of his primary role on the court which was best exemplified in Game 2 of the NBA Finals that season.

College
Lucas played college basketball for head coach Al McGuire with the then-Marquette Warriors for two years, leading them to the NCAA championship game in 1974. In the national semifinal game, Lucas led Marquette to a 64-51 victory over Kansas with game leading totals of 18 points, 14 rebounds, and 4 blocks. Marquette lost the title game to North Carolina State 76-64, while Lucas played the full 40 minutes of the game, leading his team with both 21 points and 13 rebounds.

ABA
In 1973, the Carolina Cougars of the American Basketball Association (ABA) obtained that league's rights to Lucas in the first round of the ABA draft. In 1974, Lucas was also selected by the Chicago Bulls of the National Basketball Association (NBA) with the 14th pick of the NBA draft. Lucas chose the ABA over the NBA, joining the Spirits of St. Louis team, which had since supplanted the Carolina Cougars in the ABA. During his first season, Lucas averaged 13.2 points per game, and 10 rebounds per game, and he was chosen for the 1974–75 ABA All-Rookie second team. In the 1975 ABA Playoffs, Lucas averaged 16.3 points, 14.7 rebounds, and 5 assists per game, as the Spirits advanced past the New York Nets in the first round with a 4-1 series victory before losing to the eventual champion Kentucky Colonels in the Eastern Division Finals.

On December 17, 1975, part way through his second season with the Spirits, Lucas was traded to the Kentucky Colonels in exchange for Caldwell Jones. Lucas was an ABA All-Star for the 1975–76 season, and he averaged 17.0 points and 11.3 rebounds per game.  Lucas remained with the Colonels through that team's loss in the semifinals of the 1976 ABA Playoffs to the Denver Nuggets and through the ABA–NBA merger in 1976.

NBA

After the ABA–NBA merger, Lucas was selected by the Portland Trail Blazers in the subsequent ABA Dispersal Draft in which the Kentucky Colonels and Spirits of St. Louis players were selected by NBA teams. Portland had traded Geoff Petrie and Steve Hawes to the Atlanta Hawks for the second overall pick, which they used to select Lucas. In the 1976–77 NBA season, Lucas led the Trail Blazers in scoring, minutes played, field goals, free throws, and offensive rebounds. Not only did the team qualify for their first trip to the playoffs that season, but Lucas and teammate Bill Walton led the Trail Blazers past the favored Los Angeles Lakers, sweeping them 4–0 in the Western Conference Finals, and a surprising come-from-behind 4–2 upset victory over the Philadelphia 76ers in the 1977 NBA Finals.

In that NBA Finals series, Lucas asserted his "enforcer" role in Game 2. With the 76ers comfortably ahead late in the game, the Blazers streaked down the floor on a fast break. Lionel Hollins missed the shot, both Bob Gross and Darryl Dawkins went up and wrestled for the rebound, and both came crashing to the floor. As Dawkins ran up court, he threw a punch that largely missed Gross, nailing his own teammate Doug Collins instead.  As Dawkins reached mid-court, Lucas greeted him with an elbow to the head, after which they briefly squared off.  Both benches emptied and Dawkins and Lucas were ejected. Although the 76ers would go on to win the game and go up 2–0 in the series, Lucas' actions appeared to alter the momentum of the series in favor of the Blazers. Inspired, Portland won the next two games at home in blowouts, then won at Philadelphia, and closed out the 76ers at home to win the series. Sports Illustrated featured Lucas on their cover for their 1977-78 NBA preview issue, spotlighting enforcers throughout the league. He remained with Portland until 1980 when he was traded to the New Jersey Nets in exchange for Calvin Natt. On February 13, 1981, Lucas set a career high with 6 blocks, while also scoring 31 points and grabbing 13 rebounds, during a 103-100 New Jersey win over the Indiana Pacers.

After a year with the Nets, Lucas was traded to the New York Knicks for Ray Williams. In 1982, he was dealt to the Phoenix Suns for Truck Robinson. In Phoenix, Lucas helped an injury-plagued Suns team reach the Western Conference Finals in 1984. Ironically, Lucas would sign with the team Phoenix lost to in 1984, the Los Angeles Lakers, following the 1985 season. On Wednesday, December 4, 1985, Lucas made a 60-foot shot at the regulation buzzer to send the game into overtime.  The Lakers would go on to defeat the Utah Jazz 131-127.  After the Lakers lost the 1986 Western Conference Finals to the Houston Rockets, Lucas moved to the Seattle SuperSonics for one year, before returning to the Trail Blazers for his final NBA season in 1988.

In his fourteen-year professional basketball career – two in the ABA and 12 in the NBA – Lucas scored 14,857 points and gathered 9,306 rebounds in 1021 games. He was a five-time All-Star – one in the ABA and four in the NBA. He was named to the 1978 All-NBA-Defense First team, the 1978 All-NBA Second team and the 1979 All-NBA-Defense Second team.

Post-playing career
Lucas was hired by the Portland Trail Blazers as an assistant coach under Mike Schuler and Rick Adelman during the 1988–89 season. In 2005, Lucas rejoined the Trail Blazers as an assistant coach under Nate McMillan.

Personal life
Lucas underwent surgery for bladder cancer in April 2009. With his health continuing to be a concern, Lucas resigned his coaching position following the 2009–2010 season.

Lucas died at his home in Portland, Oregon, on October 31, 2010. Services were also held in his childhood home town, Pittsburgh. The Blazers honored him by wearing No. 20 patches on their jerseys for the 2010–2011 season.

His son, David Lucas, played for Oregon State University from 2001 to 2005.

Legacy
The Portland Trail Blazers retired his jersey number, 20, in a ceremony on November 4, 1988.

On August 23, 1997 at the ABA's 30 Year Reunion celebration, Lucas was named to the All-Time All-ABA Team along with Hall of Fame members Julius Erving, Dan Issel, George Gervin, Rick Barry, Connie Hawkins and other ABA greats.

Luke Walton, son of Lucas' Portland teammate and Hall of Famer Bill Walton and multiple-team NBA head coach, is named after him.

References

External links

BLAZERS: Learn More About Maurice Lucas
Remember the ABA: Maurice Lucas

1952 births
2010 deaths
African-American basketball coaches
African-American basketball players
All-American college men's basketball players
American men's basketball players
Basketball players from Pittsburgh
Deaths from cancer in Oregon
Carolina Cougars draft picks
Chicago Bulls draft picks
Deaths from bladder cancer
Kentucky Colonels players
Los Angeles Lakers players
Marquette Golden Eagles men's basketball players
National Basketball Association All-Stars
National Basketball Association players with retired numbers
New Jersey Nets players
New York Knicks players
Phoenix Suns players
Portland Trail Blazers assistant coaches
Portland Trail Blazers players
Power forwards (basketball)
Schenley High School alumni
Seattle SuperSonics players
Spirits of St. Louis players
Basketball players from Portland, Oregon
20th-century African-American sportspeople
21st-century African-American people